A sun hat (also known as the floppy hat, harvest hat or field hat) is any hat or headgear specifically designed to shade the face, neck and shoulders from direct sunlight, usually with a circumferentially protruding semi-rigid brim that can range from small to large, but as a general guideline around  in width.

Sun hat can incorporate a variety of materials and styles, including the straw hat, cone hat, Boonie hat and the pith helmet (sun helmet). In modern times, sun hats are common in places around the world, mainly in holiday resorts with plentiful direct sunlight, usually in tropical countries close to the Earth's equator. They are particularly useful in protecting against UV-induced sunburns and skin cancers on the face and neck.

Gallery

See also
Akubra
Boater
Breton (hat)
Buntal hat
Bush hat (disambiguation)
Campaign hat
Cowboy hat
Panama hat
Sailor hat
Sombrero
Sports visor
Straw hat

References 

Hats